Dunckerocampus multiannulatus (many-banded pipefish) is a species of marine fish of the family Syngnathidae. It is widespread in the Indian Ocean, from the Red Sea and South Africa to the Andaman Islands and Sumatra, Indonesia. It is an active cleaner, feeding on small crustaceans that grow on other fishes. This species is ovoviviparous, with males carrying eggs and giving birth to live young.

References

Further reading

Encyclopedia of Life
Wildscreen Arkive

multiannulatus
Marine fish
Fish described in 1903